Dorset County Hospital NHS Foundation Trust runs Dorset County Hospital, an NHS district general hospital in the town of Dorchester, Dorset, England. The hospital is the hub of the district's inpatient facilities but community hospitals, formerly owned by the North and South West Dorset primary care groups are situated in the surrounding major towns and provide the 'spokes' to the central unit. Dorset County Hospital has 500 beds.

Performance

In the Sunday Times Good Hospital Guide 2004, West Dorset's patient satisfaction rating is bettered by only one trust in England  and it scores well with respect to most of the other performance indicators. The mortality rate is 8% below the expected level and is among the best 30 nationally. The trust is just one of five in England where all inpatients are admitted within six months of referral and the proportion of outpatients seen by a consultant within 13 weeks of referral is among the 30 highest. The trust's facilities are also very clean: it is ranked in the top ten in England for the high standards of cleanliness in the A&E department and in outpatients' toilets.

In 2005, the hospital was awarded three-star status in the NHS's performance ratings.

Proposals to transfer the pathology department to a private provider were rejected in October 2014 after 11,000 people signed a petition protesting against the plan.

Services
The trust's clinical services are organised into four directorates and provide the following services centralised on the Dorset County Hospital Site.

Emergency and medical services
 A & E
 Elderly Care
 General Medical Wards, Units and Specialities
 Neurology
 Dermatology
 Critical care (ITU, HDU, CCU)
 Renal (county-wide service)
 Clinical haematology
 Neurophysiology

Planned and surgical services
 Anaesthetics
 Day surgery
 Urology
 Ophthalmology
 ENT
 Outpatient (DCH & Weymouth)
 Theatres
 Trauma and orthopaedics
 Rheumatology
 General surgery

Family services
 Child health
 Gynaecology
 Maternity
 Oral, orthodontic & dental services
 Genitourinary medicine
The trust has a special care baby unit but this is not suitable for babies requiring intensive care.  Babies born before 32 weeks have to be transferred to other hospitals in the Thames Valley and Wessex Neonatal Network.

Diagnostic services
 Pathology and haematology
 Medical physics
 Diagnostic imaging including spiral CT, MRI and nuclear medicine

The hospital is also recognised as a cancer unit for the provision of services for patients with gynaecological, breast, colorectal, urological, upper gastrointestinal, lung and haematological malignancies. While most chemotherapy is given locally, the radiotherapy centre is in the Cancer Centre at Poole Hospital.

See also
 Healthcare in Dorset
 List of hospitals in England
 List of NHS trusts

References

External links 
 
 Dorset County Hospital NHS Foundation Trust on the NHS website
 Inspection reports from the Care Quality Commission
 The History of Dorset County Hospital

NHS foundation trusts
Health in Dorset